Pinoyscincus is a genus of skinks, lizards in the family Scincidae. All species in the genus are endemic to the Philippines. Species in this genus were previously assigned to the genus Sphenomorphus.

Species
The following five species, listed alphabetically by specific name, are recognized as being valid:

Pinoyscincus abdictus 
Pinoyscincus coxi  – Cox's sphenomorphus
Pinoyscincus jagori  – Jagor's sphenomorphus
Pinoyscincus llanosi  – Leyte sphenomorphus
Pinoyscincus mindanensis  – Mindanao sphenomorphus

Nota bene: A binomial authority in parentheses indicates that the species was originally described in a genus other than Pinoyscincus.

References

Further reading
Linkem CW, Diesmos AC, Brown RM (2011). "Molecular systematics of the Philippine forest skinks (Squamata: Scincidae: Sphenomorphus): testing morphological hypotheses of interspecific relationships". Zoological Journal of the Linnean Society 163 (4): 1217–1243. (Pinoyscincus, new genus).

Pinoyscincus
Lizard genera
Endemic fauna of the Philippines
Taxa named by Charles W. Linkem
Taxa named by Arvin Cantor Diesmos
Taxa named by Rafe M. Brown